The Brenthurst Foundation is a Johannesburg-based think-tank established by the Oppenheimer family in 2004 to support the Brenthurst Initiative in seeking ways to fund African development and to organize conferences on African competitiveness.

Description

The Foundation was created to build on the Oppenheimers' Brenthurst Initiative of August 2003. The Initiative was designed to instigate a debate in South Africa around policy strategies to achieve higher rates of economic expansion. Today the Foundation now has a wider African focus and aims to find ways to draw the investment needed for "continental regeneration and prosperity".  The organization intends to make a worthwhile contribution to economic growth in Africa by creating an environment conducive to positive economic change in order to strengthen the importance of Africa in the global market. It works to set up government policy platforms for economic development through organizing high-level governmental dialogues, supporting economic and political research on topical and important issues, and disseminating practical policy advice to relevant actors. The organization has been described as a frontier of knowledge for strengthening Africa’s economic performance.

The Foundation has been active in a range of roles in various countries across the continent, such as their involvement in a Presidential Advisory Committee on the Economy set up by former President Joyce Banda of Malawi., their collaboration with the Tony Elumelu Foundation of Nigeria to investigate enterprise and private sector development, and other government secondments and/or engagements in Rwanda, Liberia, Lesotho, Mozambique, Mali, Zambia, Eswatini, Botswana, Somaliland, Sudan, Ghana, Morocco, Somaliland and Zimbabwe.

The Foundation also organizes regular policy study-tours for its African partners to a number of countries. These aim to expose African opinion-formers to development 'best practice'. These trips have included participation by officials up to the prime-ministerial level, and incorporated meetings with current and former heads of state. Countries visited in the past include: Vietnam (2007, 2009, 2011), Singapore (2008 and 2009), Cambodia (2011), Panama (2009), Colombia (2009 and 2014), Costa Rica (2009), El Salvador (2009) and Morocco (2008).

People
Advisory Board

The Brenthurst Foundation Advisory Board comprises a number of eminent and notable government officials, academics, and business leaders. It is chaired by Olusegun Obasanjo, the former President of Nigeria. Other members of the Board include Jonathan Oppenheimer, Deputy Chair to Commission to the African Union Erastus Mwencha, President of the American Jewish University, USA Jeffrey Herbst, former Prime Minister of Mozambique Luísa Diogo, Former Prime Minister of Ethiopia Hailemariam Desalegn, Former President of Liberia and Nobel Laureate Ellen Johnson Sirleaf .

Associates

The Brenthurst Foundation benefits from the knowledge and expertise of a wide range of scholars, policy-makers and experts from all over the world. They range from musician Johnny Clegg to Juan Carlos Echeverry, the former Minister of Finance and Public Credit for Colombia.

Tswalu Dialogue

The annual Tswalu Dialogue meeting series was established in 2002 as a premier African forum to discuss issues of concern to continental development and security. Hosted by Jonathan Oppenheimer at the Tswalu Kalahari Game Reserve in South Africa’s Kalahari Desert, the Tswalu Dialogue has involved active collaboration between a variety of international partners. Attended by a mix of policy-makers, analysts, academia, civil and military personnel, media and businesspeople, the Tswalu Dialogues remains an annual event.

References

External links
The Brenthurst Foundation

Political and economic research foundations
Political and economic think tanks based in South Africa